Bovee or Bovée may refer to : 
 Bovée-sur-Barboure, a commune in the Meuse department France
 Bovee, South Dakota, a community in the United States
 Christian Nestell Bovee (1820-1904), an epigrammatic New York writer
 Leslie Bovee, an American pornographic actress
 Matthias J. Bovee (1793-1872), an American Representative from New York
 Mike Bovee, (born 1973), a retired professional baseball player

See also
 Bové, a surname (including a list of people with the name)